Augsburg Zoo is a zoo located in the city of Augsburg in Bavaria, Germany, and with over 600,000 visitors annually, the zoo belongs to the 20 largest Zoos in Germany.

Augsburg Zoo holds 1,600 animals belonging to 300 different species. Of those animals, the zoo keeps 100 reptiles and amphibians from 25 species. The zoo is involved in the 18 European Endangered Species Programmes.

History

Already in year 800, the town of Augsburg had tropical species of animals within its borders, when Emperor Charlemagne placed his Asian elephant Abul-Abbas in Augsburg. An elephant was a gift to the emperor from the caliph Ar-Rashid, and was walked from Italy through Achen Pass to Germany, and later walked to Augsburg where the emperor preferred to keep his elephant.

In 1410, an enclosure for deer was established at the city wall, those deer were shot by French soldiers in 1796 during the war of War of the First Coalition.
with the name Park der deutschen Tierwelt in order to display German animals. There were also plans to build a traditional Swabian farm, a project which was never realized.

During the World War II, most parts of the zoo were destroyed, and the zoo was closed in 1943, and re-opened again in 1947.

After the re-opening, the public showed an interest to see exotic animal species, hence the name was changed to Augsburger Tiergarten after World War II, and the first exotic animal species was introduced in the zoo.

References
Much of the content of this article comes from the equivalent German-language wikipedia article.  Retrieved on 12 December 2014. The following references are cited by that German-language article:

External links

Zoos in Germany
Buildings and structures in Augsburg